Goreswar College is an institute of higher education in the north-eastern part of Baksa district, Assam. The college is affiliated to Gauhati University.

Accreditation
In 2016 the college has been awarded "B" grade by National Assessment and Accreditation Council.

References

External links
 

Colleges affiliated to Gauhati University
1974 establishments in Assam
Educational institutions established in 1974